Marko Milić (Serbian Cyrillic: Марко Милић; born November 6, 1987) is a Serbian footballer who plays for FK Buxoro in the Uzbekistan Pro League.

Career
On 9 February 2021, FK Buxoro announced the signing of Milić.

Career statistics

Honors
Istiklol
 Tajikistan Higher League (1): 2020
 Tajik Supercup (1): 2020

References

External links
 
 Marko Milić stats at utakmica.rs 
 

Living people
1987 births
Footballers from Belgrade
Serbian footballers
FK Bežanija players
OFK Beograd players
FK Novi Pazar players
FK Čelik Nikšić players
FK Timok players
FK Zemun players
Serbian First League players
Serbian SuperLiga players
Association football defenders